Aleksandar Alempijević (born July 25, 1988) is a Serbian football player who plays as a defensive midfielder.

Career 
Born in Čačak, SR Serbia, SFR Yugoslavia, he started playing with FK Partizan youth team. Between 2006 and 2008 he played 2 seasons with Partizan satellite club FK Teleoptik in Serbian third tier.  In 2008, he moved to Hungary and joined Kecskeméti TE where he played the following 4 seasons.  In summer 2012 he moved to Ferencvárosi TC.  In September 2013, after playing 5 seasons in the Nemzeti Bajnokság I, he returned to Serbia and joined top league side FK Javor Ivanjica.

Club statistics

Updated to games played as of 4 August 2013.

Honours
Ferencváros
Hungarian League Cup (1): 2012–13
Čukarički
Serbian Cup (1): 2014–15

References

External sources 
 Aleksandar Alempijević at HLSZ

1988 births
Living people
Sportspeople from Čačak
Serbian footballers
Association football midfielders
FK Teleoptik players
Kecskeméti TE players
Ferencvárosi TC footballers
Nemzeti Bajnokság I players
Serbian expatriate footballers
Expatriate footballers in Hungary
Serbian expatriate sportspeople in Hungary
FK Javor Ivanjica players
OFK Beograd players
FK Čukarički players
FK Mladost Lučani players
Serbian SuperLiga players